Planica 1951 was an International ski jumping week with international competition on Srednja Bloudkova K80 hill, held on 11 March 1951 in Planica, PR Slovenia, FPR Yugoslavia. Circa 15,000 people has gathered.

Schedule

Competitions
On 6 March 1951, training on Planica week opening day on K80 normal hill with 13 ski jumpers was on schedule. Each of them made three to four jumps. Dobrin was the longest with 72.5 metres.

On 8 March 1951, training on K80 normal hill with 18 Yugoslavians, 2 Austrians and 2 Swiss was on schedule. Janez Polda was the longest with 74 metres.

On 9 March 1951, training on K80 normal hill with 14 Yugoslavians and 10 Austrians was on schedule. Austrian Josef Bradl was the longest with 75.5 metres.

On 11 March 1951, an international competition with 23 competititors from Yugoslavia, Austria and Switzerland on K80 normal hill was on schedule. Josef Bradl won the event with 79 and 73.5 metres.

Training 1
6 March 1951 – Four rounds – incomplete  — longest jump

Training 2
8 March 1951 – the longest jump

Training 3
9 March 1951 – the longest jump

 Fall or touch!

International competition

11 March 1951 — Two rounds — official results

References

1951 in Yugoslav sport
1951 in ski jumping
1951 in Slovenia
Ski jumping competitions in Yugoslavia
International sports competitions hosted by Yugoslavia
Ski jumping competitions in Slovenia
International sports competitions hosted by Slovenia